This article attempts to list the oldest extant, freestanding buildings in the state of Wisconsin. Some dates are approximate and based on architectural studies and historical records; other dates are based on dendrochronology. All entries should include citation with reference to: architectural features indicative of the date of construction; a report by an architectural historian; or dendrochronology. If the exact year of initial construction is estimated, it will be shown as a range of dates.

To be listed here a site must:
date from prior to 1840; or
be the oldest building in a county, large city, or oldest of its type (church, government building, etc.).

List

See also
List of lighthouses in Wisconsin
List of the oldest buildings in the United States
National Register of Historic Places listings in Wisconsin

References

Informational notes

Citations 

Architecture in Wisconsin
History of Wisconsin
oldest
Wisconsin